Abraham Cohn (June 17, 1832, in Guttentag, Prussia; died June 2, 1897, in New York City) was an American Civil War Union Army soldier and recipient to the highest military decoration for valor in combat — the Medal of Honor — for having distinguished himself at the Battle of the Wilderness, Virginia, on May 6, 1864, and the Battle of the Crater, Petersburg, Virginia, on July 30, 1864.

Cohn originally enlisted with the 68th New York Infantry Regiment in October 1861, and rose to the rank of Captain before being discharged in December 1862. He re-enlisted with the 6th New Hampshire Infantry Regiment in January 1864, and was mustered out in July 1865.

Medal of Honor citation
Rank and organization: Sergeant Major, 6th New Hampshire Infantry
Place and date: At Wilderness, Virginia, May 6, 1864; At the mine, Petersburg, Virginia,  July 30, 1864
Entered service at: Campton, New Hampshire
Birth: Guttentag, Prussia
Date of issue: August 24, 1865

Citation:
During Battle of the Wilderness rallied and formed, under heavy fire, disorganized and fleeing troops of different regiments. At Petersburg, Va., July 30, 1864, bravely and coolly carried orders to the advanced line under severe fire.

See also

List of Jewish Medal of Honor recipients
List of American Civil War Medal of Honor recipients: A–F

Notes

References

Abraham Cohn at Find a grave

1832 births
1897 deaths
People from Olesno County
People from the Province of Silesia
American people of German-Jewish descent
Burials at Beth Olom Cemetery
Prussian emigrants to the United States
United States Army Medal of Honor recipients
United States Army officers
Foreign-born Medal of Honor recipients
Jewish Medal of Honor recipients
American Civil War recipients of the Medal of Honor
Union Army officers